Jonathan Steele (born 7 February 1986) is a Northern Irish professional footballer. He has also received three caps for the Northern Ireland national team.

Early life
Steele was raised in a Catholic family along with three brothers in the predominantly Protestant town of Larne, about 25 miles outside of Belfast. Steele often experienced religious violence and persecution resulting from The Troubles, including being attacked outside of a video rental store. Because of this violence, Steele's mother pleaded with him to leave home and the best opportunity to play football came from Wolverhampton Wanderers. After two years of not being able to make a breakthrough with Wolverhampton, Steele was released after the 2002–2003 season. At the age of 18, he then decided to try to earn a contract elsewhere in Europe or with Major League Soccer of the United States instead of returning home to Northern Ireland.

Club

England
Steele started his career with Wolverhampton Wanderers in England between 2002–2004. Although he featured for the youth and reserve sides, never played a game for the senior team.

United States
Steele moved to the United States in 2003, for an ultimately unsuccessful trial with the Dallas Burn of Major League Soccer. Instead, he signed with the Syracuse Salty Dogs of the USL First Division in 2004. and that fall, he joined the Kansas City Comets of Major Indoor Soccer League. He played thirteen games before the Comets placed him on the inactive roster to allow him to compete with the Northern Ireland U-19 national team. He returned to the United States in 2005 and spent the summer with the Rochester Rhinos. As the Comets had folded at the end of the 2004–2005 season, the Baltimore Blast selected Steele with the 26th pick in the Dispersal Draft.

Return home
He returned home to Northern Ireland in August 2005 and had a short spell with Irish League side Ballymena United, before returning to America when his short-term contract expired.

Return to the United States
He won the 2006 MISL Championship with the Blast, and played for the Rhinos again in the summer of 2006. In the spring of 2007, he signed with the expansion Carolina RailHawks of the USL First Division. He was also the first pick of the expansion Orlando Sharks in the 2007 MISL Expansion Draft, but was traded to the Philadelphia KiXX in exchange for Gaston Pernia. Steele played seventeen games with the KiXX during the 2007–2008 MISL season, missing part of the season with a foot injury.

In the spring of 2008, he moved to the Puerto Rico Islanders of USL-1. He was a key part of a team which took the USL-1 championship and was named the 2008 USL-1 MVP.

On 23 December 2009, Steele signed a one-year contract with Vancouver Whitecaps. Steele, along with Whitecaps teammate Ricardo Sánchez, was transferred to league rivals FC Tampa Bay on 21 July 2010.

Carolina RailHawks, now in the second division North American Soccer League, re-acquired Steele on a season-long loan from FC Tampa Bay on 24 February 2011.

Steele signed with Syracuse Silver Knights of Major Indoor Soccer League for the 2011–12 indoor season on 23 September 2011. He was released from the team mid-season.

Major League Soccer

On 23 February 2012 Steele tweeted that he had joined Real Salt Lake of Major League Soccer, a club from which he spurned a contract offer two years earlier in favour of joining the Vancouver Whitecaps. The signing was official on 24 February 2012. During his first season with the club, Steele made 28 appearances, including 11 starts, tallying two assists and scoring two goals including a stoppage-time game winner against Toronto FC on 28 April 2012.

Steele's option was declined by Salt Lake on 3 December 2012 as part of a salary cap issue, along with the trade and release of six other players, including starters Jamison Olave, Fabian Espindola, and Will Johnson.

After being released by RSL, Steele trained with Cliftonville F.C. of the IFA Premiership and was reportedly days away from signing for an unnamed League 2 club before being contacted by New York Red Bull's head coach Mike Petke. Steele signed with the Major League Soccer club on 20 February 2013 and solidified his spot in the starting line-up. Steele scored his first goal for the Red Bulls on 20 April 2013 in a 4–1 victory over the New England Revolution. In the same match, Steele tallied his second assist of the season on a goal by Thierry Henry. Steele ended his first season with New York making 36 official appearances and scoring 6 goals, while the team finished with the best overall record in MLS, winning the Supporter's Shield, the first major honor in club history.

In 2014, Steele made 16 appearances, scoring one goal and recording 2 assists, but only started 7 matches. He and the Red Bulls mutually agreed to part ways on 10 July 2014.

Newcastle Jets
Three days after parting ways with the Red Bulls, it was confirmed that Steele had signed for the Newcastle Jets of the A-League in Australia.

Steele and Newcastle Jets mutually agreed to terminate his contract on December 23, 2014.

Minnesota United FC
On January 8, 2015, Minnesota United FC announced the signing of Jonny Steele. After a disappointing showing due to injuries, Steele was released by United on July 1, 2015.

Ottawa Fury
Steele signed a contract with Ottawa Fury FC on January 12, 2016.

Miami FC
Steele moved again on July 14, 2016, this time to NASL side Miami FC.

Ramsgate
At the end of May 2019 it was announced that Steele had joined Ramsgate. He was released by Ramsgate on 21 October 2019.

International
Steele represented Northern Ireland from the Under-15 to the Under-19 level. In 2001, he was part of the Under-16 side that competed in the Victory Shield tournament against the other British nations. Steele earned three caps for the Under-19 side in the 2005 UEFA European Under-19 Football Championship against Germany, Serbia and Montenegro, and Greece in Group A. The tournament was held in his native Northern Ireland but the hosts did not advance past the group stage. Steele was also a member of the U19 squad that competed in the 2005 Milk Cup and scored a goal against the United States during a 4–2 loss in the final.

In April 2013, following Steele's impressive performances with New York, Northern Ireland manager Michael O'Neill stated that he was monitoring Steele's progress and that he could receive his first call up as early as the next squad selection. Seven months later, Steele received his first call up to the senior squad for a friendly against Turkey to be played on 15 November 2013 in Adana after originally being left out of the squad again because of expected club commitments. This call up was the first time Steele was called into camp for Northern Ireland at any level since the 2005 Milk Cup.

Steele made his senior international debut for Northern Ireland in the match against Turkey, coming on as a 67th-minute substitute for Niall McGinn as Northern Ireland lost 1-0. In May 2014, Steele was again called up for the friendly away matches against Uruguay and Chile on 30 May and 4 June respectively as the opposition prepared for the 2014 FIFA World Cup.

International career statistics

Honours

Club
Puerto Rico Islanders
Commissioner's Cup Winners:2008

New York Red Bulls
MLS Supporters' Shield: 2013

Individual
USL First Division MVP: 2008

Gallery

References

External links

Profile at Irish FA

1986 births
Living people
Baltimore Blast (2001–2008 MISL) players
North Carolina FC players
Expatriate footballers in Puerto Rico
Expatriate soccer players in the United States
Expatriate soccer players in Canada
Tampa Bay Rowdies players
Association football midfielders
Kansas City Comets (2001–2005 MISL) players
Major Indoor Soccer League (2001–2008) players
Major League Soccer players
Minnesota United FC (2010–2016) players
New York Red Bulls players
Newcastle Jets FC players
North American Soccer League players
Northern Ireland youth international footballers
Association footballers from Northern Ireland
Expatriate association footballers from Northern Ireland
Expatriate sportspeople from Northern Ireland in the United States
People from Larne
Philadelphia KiXX (2001–2008 MISL) players
Puerto Rico Islanders players
Real Salt Lake players
Rochester New York FC players
Syracuse Salty Dogs players
Syracuse Silver Knights players
A-League (1995–2004) players
USL First Division players
USSF Division 2 Professional League players
Vancouver Whitecaps (1986–2010) players
Wolverhampton Wanderers F.C. players
Ballymena United F.C. players
NIFL Premiership players
Northern Ireland international footballers
Ottawa Fury FC players
Miami FC players
Ramsgate F.C. players
National Premier Soccer League players
Expatriate sportspeople from Northern Ireland in Canada
Expatriate sportspeople from Northern Ireland in Puerto Rico